Verinice is a free and open source information security management system (ISMS) application which can help in creating and maintaining systems for information and security management.

Verinice was written and is maintained primarily by a German company named SerNet Service Network GmbH.

Verinice is licensed under GNU General Public License (version 3 or later).

Its main users are usually small and medium companies, some big enterprises and government agencies.

In Germany, Verinice is the recommended
 ISMS tool from German Association of the Automotive Industry (VDA) for its members like Volkswagen, Daimler AG, Fiat and other big manufacturers. VDA is also sponsoring Verinice development since release 1.2.

Verinice supports the operating systems Windows, Linux and OS X and has licensed the IT Baseline Protection Catalogs from the Federal Office for Information Security.

Other tools for creating ISMS 
 CertVision NormTracker 
 HiScout GRC Suite  
 GS Tool
 SecuMax
 CRISAM
 ibi systems iris
 eramba

References

External links 
 module for data privacy from federal commissioner for data protection and information freedom
 Interest group of German car manufacturers
 baseline protection module for car manufacturers
 Verinice Download

Data security